Saeid Ramezani (born August 16, 1976) is an Iranian retired football player. He is the son-in-law of Nasser Hejazi.

Club career
Ramezani joined Foolad in 2008 after spending the previous three seasons at Esteghlal Ahvaz.

Club Career Statistics
Last Update  13 December 2012

 Assist Goals

References

Iranian footballers
Sepahan S.C. footballers
Esteghlal F.C. players
Foolad FC players
Esteghlal Ahvaz players
Zob Ahan Esfahan F.C. players
Persian Gulf Pro League players
1976 births
Living people
Association football midfielders